Chris Monson was a member of the Wisconsin State Assembly, elected in 1910. Other positions he held include town clerk of Akan, Wisconsin, postmaster of Five Points, Richland County, Wisconsin and justice of the peace. He was a Republican. Monson was born in Akan on August 25, 1875.

References

People from Richland County, Wisconsin
City and town clerks
Wisconsin postmasters
American justices of the peace
Republican Party members of the Wisconsin State Assembly
1875 births
Year of death missing
Leaders of the American Society of Equity